Stanley Rudolph Sczurek (born March 7, 1937) is a former professional football player. He was drafted by both the National Football League (NFL) and the American Football League (AFL), but he elected to play for his hometown team, the Cleveland Browns, which belonged to the NFL.

Sczurek was released by the Cleveland Browns before the beginning of the 1966 season. He was later signed by the New York Giants and played one season with them before retiring. He had one fumble recovery and one interception in his brief career, playing 45 games in four seasons; at the time, seasons had 14 games.

References

1937 births
Living people
American football linebackers
Cleveland Browns players
New York Giants players
Purdue Boilermakers football players
Players of American football from Cleveland